Croatia participated in the Junior Eurovision Song Contest 2003. The Croatian broadcaster Hrvatska radiotelevizija (HRT) organised an national final to select the first Croatian entry, being Dino Jelusić with the song "Ti si moja prva ljubav", which went on to win the 2003 contest.

Before Junior Eurovision

Dječja Pjesma Eurovizije 2003 
Dječja Pjesma Eurovizije 2003 was the first edition of the Croatian national selection, which selected Croatia's entry for the Junior Eurovision Song Contest 2003.

Competing entries 
Artists and composers were able to submit their entries to the broadcaster. An expert committee consisting of Alan Bjelinski, Rajko Dujmić, Boris Đurđević, Mladen Kušec, Marin Margitić, Ivana Plechinger and Maja Vučić selected ten artists and songs for the competition from the received submissions.

Final 
The final took place on 7 July 2003 at the Tvornica Kulture in Zagreb, hosted by Iva Sulentić and Frano Domitrović, while all the competing songs were accompanied by a symphony orchestra. The winner was determined by a public televote. Only the winner was announced.

At Junior Eurovision
During the running order draw which both took place on 6 October 2003, Croatia was drawn to perform second, following Greece and preceding Cyprus. Dino Jelusić went on to win the contest with 134 points, receiving the maximum 12 points from 3 countries and receiving at least two points from every competing nation.

Voting

References

Croatia
Junior
Junior Eurovision Song Contest